The First Secretary of the Karakalpak regional branch of the Communist Party of the Soviet Union was the position of highest authority in the Karakalpak AO (1925–1932) in the Kazak ASSR (from July 20, 1930 in the Russian SFSR) and the Karakalpak ASSR (1932–1991) in the Russian SFSR (from December 5, 1936 in the Uzbek SSR) of the Soviet Union. The position was created in October 1924, and abolished on September 14, 1991. The First Secretary was a de facto appointed position usually by the Politburo or the General Secretary himself.

List of First Secretaries of the Karakalpak Communist Party

See also
Karakalpak Autonomous Oblast
Karakalpak Autonomous Soviet Socialist Republic

Notes

Sources
 World Statesmen.org

1924 establishments in the Soviet Union
1991 disestablishments in the Soviet Union
Regional Committees of the Communist Party of the Soviet Union
Uzbek Soviet Socialist Republic